Father is a 1966 Hungarian drama film written and directed by István Szabó. The film is a coming of age story. The main character copes with his childhood loss of his father against the backdrop of the Hungarian Revolution of 1956 and memories of the earlier dictatorship of the  Arrow Cross Party modelled on the German Nazi Party.

Cast
 András Bálint as Takó Bence
 Miklós Gábor as Apa
 Dániel Erdély as Agyerek Takó
 Kati Sólyom as Anni
 Klári Tolnay as Anya
 Zsuzsa Ráthonyi as Anya Fiatalon
 Ilona Petényi
 Rita Békés
 Judit Halász
 Anna Nagy
 Zsuzsa Balogh

Reception
The film won the Grand Prix at the 5th Moscow International Film Festival and the Special Jury Prize at Locarno, and established Szabó as a director of international stature. The film was also selected as the Hungarian entry for the Best Foreign Language Film at the 40th Academy Awards, but was not accepted as a nominee. The film was chosen to be part both of Budapest Twelve, a list of Hungarian films considered the best in 1968 and its follow-up, the New Budapest Twelve in 2000.

See also
 List of submissions to the 40th Academy Awards for Best Foreign Language Film
 List of Hungarian submissions for the Academy Award for Best Foreign Language Film

References

External links
 

1966 films
1966 drama films
1960s Hungarian-language films
Hungarian black-and-white films
Films directed by István Szabó
Hungarian drama films